Live at the Sydney Opera House may refer to:

Live at the Sydney Opera House (Olivia Newton-John album), 2008
Live at the Sydney Opera House (Josh Pyke album), 2016
Live at the Sydney Opera House (Kate Miller-Heidke album), 2017
Live at the Sydney Opera House (Joe Bonamassa album), 2019
Live at the Sydney Opera House (Paul Kelly album), 2019
Live at the Sydney Opera House (Joseph Tawadros album), 2020
Live at Sydney Opera House, an album by Bryan Adams, 2013

See also
 Sydney Opera House